John Macmillan (also credited as MacMillan) is a British actor. He began his career in theatre, earning an Ian Charleson Award nomination for his work in the productions of Hamlet and Macbeth. He was nominated for a Satellite Award for his performance in the BBC Two adaptation of King Lear (2018).

His television work includes the BBC One drama Silk (2011–2014), the Netflix sitcom Chewing Gum (2015–2017), and the Channel 4 sitcoms Back (2017–2021) and Hang Ups (2018).

Early life
Macmillan attended the Waterford Kamhlaba United World College in Mbabane, Eswatini. He has also lived in Johannesburg, Malawi, Zambia, and Oxford. Macmillan trained at the Webber Douglas Academy of Dramatic Art in London. In 2011, Macmillan opened a garden at Chatsworth Baptist Church School in West Norwood.

Career
Macmillan began his career in theatre, going on the 2007 international tour of Cymbeline as Guideris. The following year, he appeared in The Last Days of Judas Iscariotat the Almeida Theatre and Piranha Heights at Soho Theatre. He received an Ian Charleson Award nominations for his performances in the 2009 productions of Hamlet and Macbeth. That year, Macmillan made his screen debut with small roles in the horror film Heartless and the fifth series of the BBC One crime drama Hustle as Harry Fielding. In 2011, Macmillan starred in the short Friend Request Pending and appeared in the Joe Wright's 2010 action thriller film Hanna. That same year, he began starring as clerk Joe Bright in the BBC One drama Silk.

In 2015, Macmillan played staff nurse Joe Costello in the Sky One medical drama Critical (CR:IT:IC:AL), appeared in The Homecoming at Trafalgar Studios, and began playing Ronald, Tracey's long-term boyfriend in Michaela Coel's Netflix sitcom Chewing Gum. Macmillan played Victor in both the 2016 and 2017 productions of Yerma alongside Billie Piper. The cast and crew won an Obie Award in the Special Citations category. He starred in the one-man play Killer at Shoreditch Town Hall. He starred as Troye King Jones in Simon Amstell's mockumentary film Carnage and began playing Julian in the Channel 4 sitcom Back. For his performance in the 2018 BBC Two television film adaptation of King Lear, Macmillan was nominated for a Satellite Award for Best Supporting Actor. Also in 2018, Macmillan starred as Abs Walter in the Channel 4 sitcom Hang Ups and began appearing in the Black British sketch comedy Famalam.

Macmillan played Laenor Velaryon, Princess Rhaenyra's first husband, in the first season of the HBO fantasy series House of the Dragon, a Game of Thrones prequel and adaptation of George R. R. Martin's companion book Fire and Blood.

Filmography

Film

Television

Video games

Audio

Stage

Awards and nominations

Notes

References

External links
 
 John Macmillan at Curtis Brown

Living people
21st-century English male actors
Alumni of the Webber Douglas Academy of Dramatic Art
Black British male actors
British male Shakespearean actors
British male stage actors
English people of Malawian descent
Waterford Kamhlaba alumni
Year of birth missing (living people)